Jordan Brauninger (born January 19, 1987) is an American former competitive figure skater. He is the 2004 World Junior bronze medalist.

Career
Brauninger began skating at age five. He played ice hockey for three years and switched to figure skating after meeting Sergei Grinkov. He competed first as a pair skater with Samantha Skavdahl. He landed his first triple toe loop at the age of eleven and his first triple Axel when he was 16. He trained in Crescent Springs, Kentucky, coached by Stephanie Miller and Ted Masdea. He represented Northern Kentucky SC.

Brauninger retired from competitive skating during the 2005–06 season. On June 27, 2007, Disney announced that Brauninger would play the role of Troy Bolton in Disney's High School Musical: The Ice Tour.

Personal life 
Brauninger was born January 19, 1987, in Cincinnati, Ohio, and was home schooled. He lives in Ludlow, Kentucky. He married Lea Nightwalker, a Colorado figure skater, on June 1, 2014, in Fort Collins, Colorado. They divorced shortly after.

Programs

Competitive highlights
JGP: Junior Grand Prix

References

External links

 
 High School Musical: The Ice Tour

1987 births
Living people
American male single skaters
Sportspeople from Cincinnati
World Junior Figure Skating Championships medalists